Ghagh  was a 17th-century poet, philosopher and Brahmin astrologer from Northern India. He is known for writing poetry and proverbs on farmers and agriculture. His proverbs are popular among folks in the Hindi-speaking regions like Haryana, Rajasthan, Uttar Pradesh and Madhya Pradesh to the eastern boundaries of Bihar.

Biography 
According to a legend, Ghagh was born in the village called Chaudhary Sarai near Kannauj, which is located in central Uttar Pradesh, during Mughal emperor Akbar's reign in the 16th century. It is also believed that Ghagh settled in a village called Ghagh Sarai, a few kilometers away from Kannauj, on a piece of land that Akbar gifted. He had received a honorary title, Chowdhary by Akbar. Ghagh's father was a Brahmin scholar and astrologer.

According to some sources, his birth name was Bhaddar or Bhaddari and some say it was his wife's name. Some of his poems hint that he lovingly addresses his wife as Ghaghini.

His poetry suggests that he had a great knowledge of agriculture, farming and all things related to human life. His poetry and speeches are scattered in the form of proverbs, which many people have collected and published. Among these,  Ghagh and Bhaddri, compiled by Ramnaresh Tripathi (published by Hindustani Academy, 1931 AD), is a critical compilation.

Works  
There is no extant book published under the authorship of Ghagh himself but there are many that compile Ghagh's poetry and proverbs. His poetry books can be found selling at rural fairs, railway station book kiosks and roadside booksellers in the vast Hindi belt.

Some of the books which compile Ghagh's work or talks about Ghagh are as follows:
  (authored by Dr. Kiran Tripathi)
   (published by Rupesh)
  (edited by Dr. R.M.S. Vijayi, S.S. Gautam)
  (compiled by Devnarayan Diwedi)
  (authored by Dipan Kumar Chakarvarti)
  (compiled by Ganga Prasad Sharma)
  (edited by  Ramesh Pratap Singh)

References

External links 
 Ghagh Ki Kahavatein on Wikiquote 

17th-century Indian poets
17th-century Indian writers
People from Kannauj
Year of birth missing